Stenotarsus sicarius, is a species of handsome fungus beetle found in Sri Lanka.

Description
Typical length is about 3 mm. Body strongly convex, and pubescent. Entirely black in color. Elytral base is wider, and distinctively striped-dotted. Thoracic margin less elevated. Elytra suddenly widening from the shoulder. Antennae reddish, where the second to eighth joints are short and bead-shaped. Thorax wider than long, and narrowed to the front angles. Pronotal disk is convex, and puncturing by coarse floccose pubescence.

References 

Endomychidae
Insects of Sri Lanka
Insects described in 1886